The 1936 Mississippi State Maroons football team represented Mississippi State College during the 1936 college football season. Led by second-year coach Ralph Sasse, the Maroons finished 7–3–1 and played in the Orange Bowl.

Schedule

References

Mississippi State
Mississippi State Bulldogs football seasons
Mississippi State Maroons football